The Marconi Company was a British telecommunications and engineering company that did business under that name from 1963 to 1987. Its roots were in the Wireless Telegraph & Signal Company  founded by Italian inventor Guglielmo Marconi in 1897, which underwent several changes in name after mergers and acquisitions. The company was a pioneer of wireless long distance communication and mass media broadcasting, eventually becoming one of the UK's most successful manufacturing companies. In 1999, its defence equipment manufacturing division, Marconi Electronic Systems, merged with British Aerospace (BAe) to form BAE Systems. In 2006, financial difficulties led to the collapse of the remaining company, with the bulk of the business acquired by the Swedish telecommunications company, Ericsson.

History

Naming history
1897–1900: The Wireless Telegraph & Signal Company
1900–1963: Marconi's Wireless Telegraph Company
1963–1987: Marconi Company Ltd
1987–1998: GEC-Marconi Ltd
1998–1999: Marconi Electronic Systems Ltd
1999–2003: Marconi plc, with Marconi Communications as principal subsidiary
2003–2006: Marconi Corporation plc

Early history

Marconi's "Wireless Telegraph and Signal Company" was formed on 20 July 1897 after the granting of a British patent for wireless in March of that year. The company opened the world's first radio factory on Hall Street in Chelmsford northeast of London in 1898 and was responsible for some of the most important advances in radio and television. These include:

 The diode vacuum tube in 1904 (Fleming)
 Transatlantic radio broadcasting between Clifden, Ireland and Glace Bay, Nova Scotia, October 17, 1907.
 High frequency tuned broadcasting
 Formation of the British Broadcasting Company (later to become the independent BBC)
 Formation of the Marconi Wireless Telegraph Company of America (assets acquired by RCA in 1920)
 Marconi International Marine Communication Co. (M.I.M.C.Co.), founded 1900 in London 
 Compagnie de Télégraphie sans Fil (C.T.S.F.), founded 1900 in the City of Brussels 
 Short wave beam broadcasting
 Radar
 Television
 Avionics

The subsidiary Marconi Wireless Telegraph Company of America, also called "American Marconi", was founded in 1899. It was the dominant radio communications provider in the US until the formation of the Radio Corporation of America (RCA) in 1919.

In 1900 the company's name was changed to "Marconi's Wireless Telegraph Company" and Marconi's Wireless Telegraph Training College was established in 1901. The company and factory was moved to New Street Works in 1912 to allow for production expansion in light of the RMS Titanic disaster. Along with private entrepreneurs, Marconi company formed in 1924 the Unione Radiofonica Italiana (URI), which was granted by Mussolini's regime a monopoly of radio broadcasts in 1924. After the war, URI became the RAI, which lives on to this day.

In 1939, the Marconi Research Laboratories at Great Baddow were founded and in 1941 there was a buyout of Marconi-Ekco Instruments to form Marconi Instruments.

Operations as English Electric subsidiary

English Electric acquired the Marconi Company in 1946 which complemented its other operations; heavy electrical engineering, aircraft and its railway traction business. In 1948 the company was reorganised into four divisions: Communications, Broadcasting, Aeronautics and Radar.

These had expanded to 13 manufacturing divisions by 1965 when a further reorganisation took place. The divisions were placed into three groups: Telecommunications, Components and Electronics.

At this time the Marconi Company had facilities at New Street Chelmsford, Baddow, Basildon, Billericay, and Writtle as well as in Wembley, Gateshead and Hackbridge. It also owned Marconi Instruments, Sanders Electronics, Eddystone Radio and Marconi Italiana (based in Genoa, Italy). In 1967 Marconi took over Stratton and Company to form Eddystone Radio.

Expansion in Canada
In 1903, Marconi founded the Marconi's Wireless Telegraph Company of Canada which was renamed as the Canadian Marconi Company in 1925. The radio business of the Canadian Marconi Company is known as Ultra Electronics TCS since 2002 and its avionic activities as CMC Electronics, owned by Esterline since 2007.

Expansion as GEC subsidiary
In 1967 or 1968, English Electric was subject to a takeover bid by the Plessey Company but chose instead to accept an offer from the General Electric Company (GEC). Under UK government pressure, the computer section of GEC, English Electric Leo Marconi (EELM), merged with International Computers and Tabulators (ICT) to form International Computers Limited (ICL). The computer interests of Elliott Automation which specialised in real-time computing were amalgamated with those of Marconi's Automation Division to form Marconi-Elliott Computers, later renamed as GEC Computers. In 1968 Marconi Space and Defence Systems and Marconi Underwater Systems were formed.

The Marconi Company continued as the primary defence subsidiary of GEC, GEC-Marconi. Marconi was renamed GEC-Marconi in 1987. During the period 1968–1999 GEC-Marconi/MES underwent significant expansion.

Acquisitions which were folded into the company and partnerships established included:

Defence operations of Associated Electrical Industries in 1968, AEI had been acquired in 1967.
Yarrow Shipbuilders in 1985
Ferranti defence businesses in 1990
Ferranti Dynamics in 1992
Vickers Shipbuilding and Engineering in 1995
Alenia Marconi Systems in 1998, a defence electronics company and an equal shares joint venture between GEC-Marconi and Finmeccanica's Alenia Difesa.
Tracor in 1998.

Other acquisitions included:
Divisions of Plessey in 1989 (others acquired by its partner in the deal, Siemens AG, to meet with regulatory approval).
Plessey Avionics
Plessey Naval Systems
Plessey Cryptography
Plessey Electronic Systems (75%)
Sippican
Leigh Instruments

In a major reorganisation of the company, GEC-Marconi was renamed Marconi Electronic Systems in 1996 and was separated from other non-defence assets.

Since 1999
In 1999, GEC underwent a major transformation. Marconi Electronic Systems, which included its wireless assets, was demerged and sold to British Aerospace which then formed BAE Systems. 

GEC, realigning itself as a primarily telecommunications company following the MES sale, retained the Marconi brand and renamed itself Marconi plc. BAE were granted limited rights to continue use of the Marconi name in existing partnerships, which had ceased by 2005. Major spending and the dot-com collapse led to a major restructuring of the Marconi group in 2003: in a debt-for-equity swap, shareholders retained 0.5% of the new company, Marconi Corporation plc.

In October 2005 the Swedish firm Ericsson offered to buy the Marconi name and most of the assets. The transaction was completed on 23 January 2006, effective as of 1 January 2006. The remainder of the Marconi company, with some 2,000 staff working on telecommunications infrastructure in the UK and the Republic of Ireland, was renamed Telent.

See also
Aerospace industry in the United Kingdom
GEC-Marconi scientist deaths conspiracy theory
Marconiphone
Marconi-Osram Valve
Imperial Wireless Chain
Sinking of the RMS Titanic (section 14 April 1912)

References

 Baker, W. J. (1970, 1996) History of the Marconi Company 1894–1965.

External links 

 Ericsson press release about the acquisition
 Catalogue of the Marconi Archives At the Department of Special Collections and Western Manuscripts, Bodleian Library, University of Oxford
 Marconi Calling The Life, Science and Achievements of Guglielmo Marconi
 History of Marconi House

Electronics companies of the United Kingdom
Computer companies of the United Kingdom
Telegraph companies of the United Kingdom
Defunct technology companies of the United Kingdom
Defunct computer hardware companies
Guglielmo Marconi
Companies based in Chelmsford
General Electric Company
Radio manufacturers